The Louisville Herald-Post  was a newspaper that was published in Louisville, Kentucky.

Origins
The Herald-Post was  created in 1925 from the merging of the old Louisville Herald and Louisville Post newspapers. Louisville financier James Buckner Brown (1872-1940)  sought to operate the paper as a counter to the positions of the Bingham newspapers the Louisville Times and the Courier-Journal. The Louisville Post'''s former editor Lewis Craig Humphrey became associate editor of the Louisville Herald-Post.

Brown invested nearly five million dollars in the combined newspapers.

Bankruptcy and new ownership
Brown lost his fortune in 1930 when his bank holding company BancoKentucky failed.  After the BancoKentucky's failure, Brown had to reduce the newspapers expenditures and it suffered in quality as a result.

John B. Gallagher
In December 1930 The Herald-Post was put into bankruptcy.  John B. Gallagher, a New York City advertiser purchased the newspaper in a bankruptcy receiver's sale for $315,000.

Walter H. Girdler
Walter H. Girdler, Sr. President of Girdler Corporation purchased a large portion of the stock in The Herald-Post in 1933 and took over control of the newspaper.

Bankruptcy and closure
The paper went bankrupt again in 1936 and this time it ceased publication and was closed.

See also

History of Louisville, Kentucky

References

Bibliography
History of The Herald-Post from the University of Louisville Libraries.
 Herald-Post Collection from the University of Louisville Photographic Archives.
 Kleber, John E: The Kentucky Encyclopedia pages 127–128, (1992).
 Kleber, John E: The Encyclopedia of Louisville pages 655–656, (2001).
 New York Times, JAMES B. BROWN, KENTUCKY BANKER; Former Bookkeeper Who Rose to Be Head of $50,000,000 Banco Corp. Dies at 68 LOST FORTUNE IN CRASH Publisher of the Old Louisville Herald-Post Had Been Tax Receiver for the City'' page 15, (October 26, 1940).

Defunct newspapers published in Louisville, Kentucky
Publications established in 1925
Publications disestablished in 1936
1925 establishments in Kentucky
1936 disestablishments in Kentucky